Kattukurichi panchayat has three villages namely Kattukurichi, Nellupattu and Kasavalanadu kovilur in the orathanadu taluk of Thanjavur district, Tamil Nadu, India.

References 
 

Villages in Thanjavur district